Hell Bent for Leather! is a studio album by Frankie Laine released in 1961 on Columbia Records.

Track listing

Charts

References 

1961 albums
Frankie Laine albums
Columbia Records albums